Robert Sawyers (born 20 November 1978) is an English retired professional footballer who played as a defender for Wolverhampton Wanderers and Barnet in the Football League.

References

1978 births
Living people
Sportspeople from Dudley
English footballers
Association football defenders
Wolverhampton Wanderers F.C. players
Barnet F.C. players
Hereford United F.C. players
Redditch United F.C. players
Stourbridge F.C. players
English Football League players